The Special Envoy for the Human Rights of LGBTQI+ Persons is a position at the United States Department of State within the Bureau of Democracy, Human Rights and Labor. The office oversees the United States government’s efforts to support the human rights of LGBTQI+ people around the world.

History 
The Office was created during the tenure of United States Secretary of State John Kerry. The first Special Envoy was Randy W. Berry, who was sworn in on April 13, 2015 and served until November 2017. The post has been vacant since that time.

The State Department relaunched its website in June 2019. As of July 2019, the new site does not contain information about this position.

In June 2021, President Joe Biden announced that he would appoint Jessica Stern to the position.

References

External links 

 Special Envoy for the Human Rights of LGBTI Persons

United States Department of State agencies